Carlo Joaquin Tadeo Lopez Katigbak (born April 24, 1970) is a Filipino executive and the current president and CEO of Philippine entertainment and giant media conglomerate, ABS-CBN Corporation.

Education
Katigbak attended Ateneo de Manila University, where he graduated with a Bachelor of Science in management engineering degree in 1991. He later completed Harvard Business School's Advanced Management Program in 2009.

Career
Katigbak commenced his career as a financial analyst for First Pacific Capital Corporation in 1992. He entered SKY Cable Corporation in 1994. He served as Corporate Finance Manager and has held various positions in Corporate Planning,
Provincial Operations and Finance at Sky Cable. He was responsible for establishing the presence of the company's services outside Metro Manila since the company's TV operation was predominantly in the metropolis. Katigbak helped Sky Cable establish presence in key cities around the Philippines. He was appointed as first managing director of the Pilipino Cable Corporation in 1998.

In 1999, Katigbak moved to ABS-CBN where he was tasked to build an online business which led to the establishment of a company named ABS-CBN Interactive. For six years served as the managing director of ABS-CBN Interactive Inc., which created and managed websites of ABS-CBN and its subsidiaries. From 2005 to 2011, Katigbak served as chief operating officer of Sky Cable.

He was named president of Sky Cable in 2013. During his tenure the company released the Digibox and reintroduced Sky Cable's broadband products, He is also the managing director of Bayan Holdings Corporation. Katigbak served as the head of ABS-CBN Access group, where he oversaw the strategy formulation and performance of Sky Cable Corporation, ABS-CBNmobile, and ABS-CBN TV Plus. He was appointed as chief operating officer of the ABS-CBN Corporation on March 1, 2015.

On December 18, 2015, ABS-CBN Corporation announced that Katigbak would be the new president and CEO of the company starting on January 1, 2016, replacing Charo Santos-Concio, who would retire from the position. Santos-Concio would still serve the company in other capacities as chief content officer, president of ABS-CBN University, and executive adviser to chairman of the board, Eugenio Lopez III.

Personal life
Katigbak is married to Charisse, whom he met in his job at Sky Cable. He pursued her when she quit after a year of working with the company. He and his wife have a son.

References

ABS-CBN executives
Living people
López family of Iloilo
Filipino chief executives
Place of birth missing (living people)
Ateneo de Manila University alumni
1970 births